Grachyovka is a rural locality (a selo) and the administrative center of Grachyovsky District, Orenburg Oblast, Russia. Population:

References

Notes

Sources

Rural localities in Orenburg Oblast